Sainte-Croix-Volvestre (Languedocien: Senta Crotz de Volvèstre) is a commune in the Ariège department in southwestern France.

Population
Inhabitants of Sainte-Croix-Volvestre are called Croissants.

See also
Communes of the Ariège department

References

Communes of Ariège (department)
Ariège communes articles needing translation from French Wikipedia